An honesty box, also known as an honour box (BrE) or honor box (AmE), is a method of charging for a service such as admission or car parking, or for a product such as home-grown produce and flowers, which relies upon each visitor paying at a box using the honor system. Tickets are not issued and such sites are usually unattended. When used in camping sites and other park settings, they are sometimes referred to as an iron ranger as there is often an iron cash box instead of an actual park ranger. Some stores also use them for selling newspapers to avoid lines at a cash register.

Such boxes are typically used in rural areas where the low number of customers and other visitors, along with the low quantity or value of the products on offer, means that an attendant would not bring a positive return on investment. Many are also domestically run operations where attendance is not feasible. 

The Cake Fridge, an honesty box cake fridge in Bixter, Shetland, Scotland, features in the TV adaptation of Anne Cleeves novels. 

The use of honesty boxes saw a resurgence during the COVID-19 pandemic, because purchases can be made without contact.

See also
Take a penny, leave a penny

References

Honor
Payment systems
Rural culture
Retail formats